The 2012 Murray State Racers football team represented Murray State University in the 2012 NCAA Division I FCS football season. They were led by third-year head coach Chris Hatcher and played their home games at Roy Stewart Stadium. They are a member of the Ohio Valley Conference. They finished the season 5–6, 4–4 in OVC play to finish in sixth place.

Schedule

Source: Schedule

References

Murray State
Murray State Racers football seasons
Murray State Racers football